The 1963–64 Maltese First Division was the 49th season of top-tier football in Malta.  It was contested by 8 teams, and Sliema Wanderers F.C. won the championship.

League standings

Results

References 
 Malta - List of final tables (RSSSF)

Maltese Premier League seasons
Malta
Premier